Asbri (meaning Vivacity in English) was a Welsh language pop magazine started in 1969. It was the first Welsh pop magazine. The magazine was based in Carmarthen and was published on a monthly basis. It folded in 1978 after publishing a total of thirty-three issues.

References

1969 establishments in Wales
1978 disestablishments in Wales
Monthly magazines published in the United Kingdom
Music magazines published in the United Kingdom
Defunct magazines published in the United Kingdom
Magazines established in 1969
Magazines disestablished in 1978
Welsh-language magazines
Magazines published in Wales